You Are We is the third studio album by British metalcore band While She Sleeps. The band decided to release it through their independent label Sleeps Brothers, and funded the album through PledgeMusic. It was released on 21 April 2017 in collaboration with SharpTone Records, Arising Empire and UNFD. The album was produced by the band themselves and Carl Bown.

Background and promotion
In early 2016, the band mentioned that they had begun writing for their third studio album. On 29 July, they announced that recording for the album had begun in their recently built studio. On 4 September, they revealed the first single, titled "Civil Isolation", and on 12 September launched pre-orders and a PledgeMusic campaign for the album. Also on 12 September they parted ways with their record label. The second single, "Hurricane", was released on 20 November, alongside an announcement of the album title and release date. The same day the band announce their signing to Australian independent label UNFD.

On 20 January 2017, the band released the third single and title track "You Are We". On 23 February, they released a song titled "Silence Speaks" featuring Oliver Sykes, vocalist of Bring Me the Horizon. In April 2017, the group embarked on a month long tour of the United Kingdom and Ireland. On 17 April, four days before the album release, the band released the fifth single "Feel". On 2 May 2018, the band announced the deluxe edition of You Are We set for release on 20 July 2018, featuring unheard material, demos and live tracks from their September 2017 stripped down show at St. Pancras Church.

Critical reception

You Are We received an average score of 84 out of 100 based on 4 reviews, which indicates "universal acclaim" on Metacritic.

Commercial performance
The album debuted on the UK Albums Chart at number 8.

Track listing

Personnel
Credits adapted from Discogs.

While She Sleeps
 Lawrence "Loz" Taylor – lead vocals
 Sean Long – lead guitar, backing vocals
 Mat Welsh – rhythm guitar, vocals, piano, artwork, illustration
 Aaran McKenzie – bass, backing vocals
 Adam "Sav" Savage – drums, percussion, artwork, illustration

Additional musicians
 Oliver Sykes of Bring Me the Horizon – guest vocals on track 6, "Silence Speaks"
 Marcia Richards of The Skints – additional vocals on track 8, "Hurricane"

Additional personnel
 Carl Bown – production, engineering, mixing, mastering
 While She Sleeps – production
 Phil Gornell – engineering
 Jim Pinder – engineering
 Ste Kerry – mastering
 Dan Jenkins – management
 Giles Smith – photography
 David Bichard – photography

Charts

References

2017 albums
While She Sleeps albums
SharpTone Records albums
UNFD albums
Crowdfunded albums